Coiled-coil domain containing 104 is a protein that in humans is encoded by the CCDC104 gene.

Model organisms

Model organisms have been used in the study of CCDC104 function. A conditional knockout mouse line, called Ccdc104tm1a(EUCOMM)Wtsi was generated as part of the International Knockout Mouse Consortium program — a high-throughput mutagenesis project to generate and distribute animal models of disease to interested scientists.

Male and female animals underwent a standardized phenotypic screen to determine the effects of deletion. Twenty one tests were carried out on homozygous mutant mice and one significant abnormality was observed: increased susceptibility to Citrobacter infection.

References

Further reading 

Human proteins
Genes mutated in mice